Patamar Capital (formerly Unitus Impact) is an early-stage venture capital firm investing in companies serving the “mass market” in South and Southeast Asia. The firm has been investing in the region for 15+ years and has a strong focus on financial services companies and innovative tech-enabled distribution platforms. With active investments and offices in India, Indonesia, the Philippines, Sri Lanka, and Vietnam, Patamar helps its portfolio companies expand on a regional basis. Patamar just held a $50m first close of its new US fund that includes institutional investors and prominent family offices in South and SE Asia, Australia, Europe, and the US.

Investments
Patamar Capital was founded with an express purpose––to test the viability of a venture capital approach to (a) improving the livelihoods of the working poor and (b) building valuable companies that would attract mainstream investors to invest in similar companies in the future. To this end, Patamar Capital primarily invests in companies engaging in supply chain or distribution platforms which aim to provide increased value to the poor. The following companies make up Patamar Capital's investment portfolio as of April 1, 2020:

 AIAH
 Big Tree Farms
 Canal Circle
 Dana Cita
 iCare Benefits
 JanaCare
 Jupviec
 Kalibrr
 Kinara Capital
 LEAF
 Mapan
 mClinica
 Micro Benefits
 SayurBox
 Supahands
 Topica
 Trustcircle
UPay
 Vasham

Affiliation and experience
Patamar Capital is a member of the Unitus Group, a federation of enterprises aiming to reduce poverty through market-based solutions, which includes Unitus Labs (formerly Unitus, Inc.), Unitus Equity Fund (now managed by Elevar Equity), Unitus Capital, and Unitus Seed Fund. The Patamar team can claim 70+ years of venture capital/private equity investment experience as well as a combined 17 years investing experience in South and Southeast Asia.

Patamar Capital, itself, is a member of Aspen Network of Development Entrepreneurs, Asian Venture Philanthropy Network, and the Global Impact Investing Network. As of May 2017, Patamar Capital has partnered with Investing in Women, an Australian government-led initiative, to finance the growth of SMEs in Indonesia, the Philippines and Vietnam.

References

External links
 Official website

Companies based in San Francisco
2011 establishments in California